Hugo Filipe Gonçalves Martins de Sousa (born 4 June 1992) is a Portuguese professional footballer who plays as a central defender for Super League Greece club Ionikos.

Club career
Born in Santa Marinha (Vila Nova de Gaia), Sousa joined FC Porto's youth system in 2004, aged 12. Seven years later, after having playing in several sides at the club, he made his senior debut with FC Brașov in the Romanian Liga I, signing alongside compatriot Ricardo Machado.

In the summer of 2013, after one and a half seasons in the Cypriot First Division with two teams, Sousa moved back to his homeland by joining Sporting CP's reserves of the Segunda Liga. Subsequently, he returned to top-flight football with Belgian First Division A's Waasland-Beveren.

On 13 January 2017, Aris Thessaloniki F.C. announced the signing of Sousa on a one-and-a-half-year deal. He made his official debut 12 days later, in a 1–1 home draw against Olympiacos F.C. in the round of 16 of the Greek Football Cup. He scored his first Football League goal on 9 April, helping to a 2–0 home win over Kallithea FC.

Sousa agreed to extend his contract on 20 June 2018, until 2020. On 19 October 2020, he joined Romanian club FC Astra Giurgiu on a one-year deal.

Career statistics

Club

Honours
AEL Limassol
Cypriot First Division: 2011–12
Cypriot Cup runner-up: 2011–12

Sepsi OSK 
Cupa României: 2021–22

References

External links

1992 births
Living people
Sportspeople from Vila Nova de Gaia
Portuguese footballers
Association football defenders
Liga Portugal 2 players
FC Porto players
Sporting CP B players
Liga I players
FC Brașov (1936) players
FC Astra Giurgiu players
Sepsi OSK Sfântu Gheorghe players
Cypriot First Division players
AEL Limassol players
AEP Paphos FC players
Belgian Pro League players
S.K. Beveren players
Super League Greece players
Football League (Greece) players
Aris Thessaloniki F.C. players
Ionikos F.C. players
Portugal youth international footballers
Portuguese expatriate footballers
Expatriate footballers in Romania
Expatriate footballers in Cyprus
Expatriate footballers in Belgium
Expatriate footballers in Greece
Portuguese expatriate sportspeople in Romania
Portuguese expatriate sportspeople in Cyprus
Portuguese expatriate sportspeople in Belgium
Portuguese expatriate sportspeople in Greece